The list of ship launches in 1687 includes a chronological list of some ships launched in 1687.


References

1687
Ship launches